Magne Thormodsæter (born 8 July 1973 in Bergen, Norway) is a Norwegian jazz musician (upright bass) and composer, known from a dozen releases and cooperations with the likes of Terje Rypdal, Ståle Storløkken, Paolo Vinaccia, Karin Krog and John Surman.

Career 
Thormodsæter was educated on the Jazz program at Trondheim Musikkonservatorium, and is now associate Professor at Griegakademiet, Department of Music, University of Bergen. He has his own M.T. Trio, and also plays within bands like "Bungalow", Knut Kristiansen Trio, Lena Skjerdal Trio, Qvales Ensemble, The Wedding and Zumo.

Honors 
Vossajazzprisen 2004

Discography 

Within Bergen Big Band
 2003: Adventures in European New Jazz and Improvised Music (Europe Jazz Oddysey), with Mathias Rüegg "Art & Fun" on compilation with various artists
 2005: Seagull (Grappa), feat. Karin Krog conducted by John Surman recorded at the Nattjazz Festival, Bergen 2004
 2007: Meditations on Coltrane (Grappa), with The Core
 2008: Som den gyldne sol frembryter (Grappa)
 2010: Crime Scene (ECM), with Terje Rypdal recorded at the Nattjazz Festival, Bergen 2009

Collaborations
 2000: City Dust (Curling Legs), with Helén Eriksen
 2003: Adventures in European New Jazz and Improvised Music (Europe Jazz Odyssey), with various artists
 2004: Grønn (Kirkelig Kulturverksted), with Qvales Ensemble
 2005: Siste Stikk (MajorStudio), with Vamp
 2005: Join Me in the Park (EMI, Norway), with Nathalie Nordnes
 2005: Inventio (Jazzaway), within Svein Olav Herstad Trio including Håkon Mjåset Johansen
 2008: The Good or Better Side of Things (Kirkelig Kulturverksted), with "Garness»
 2012: Jeg Har Vel Ingen Kjærere (Plush Badger Music), with Anne Gravir Klykken

References

External links 
The Moment of Truth ~ Eivind Austad Trio ~ Bergen Jazzforum on YouTube

1973 births
Living people
Norwegian University of Science and Technology alumni
Norwegian jazz upright-bassists
Male double-bassists
Jazz double-bassists
Norwegian jazz composers
Musicians from Bergen
ECM Records artists
21st-century double-bassists
21st-century Norwegian male musicians
Bergen Big Band members